Dorothy Irene Hann was Miss America in 1932.

Hann, from Camden, New Jersey was the first Miss America "crowned" since 1927, due to an absence of pageants due to the Great Depression. The pageant was held in Wildwood, New Jersey instead of the traditional Atlantic City. There were no parades or other big attractions held on this day due to the high cost that the businesses could not afford during the Great Depression. On the Miss America website it states that no pageant was held in 1932. The pageant won by Hann is regarded as not official.

Miss Hann was married to Albert J. Chapman until his death in 1982. She died on July 22, 1990, in her hometown of Camden, New Jersey.

References 

Year of birth missing
People from Camden, New Jersey
1990 deaths